Rossana Fernández-Maldonado Nagaro (born 3 November 1977) is a Peruvian actress, singer and TV host descending from Italian roots. In 2006 she joined the cast of Mi problema con las mujeres, which was nominated for International Emmy for Best Comedy. In her country, she has starred in the musicals Cabaret and Amor sin barreras (West Side Story).

She has been an antagonist of the telenovelas La mujer en el espejo and La Traición.

Filmography

Theatre

Discography

References

External links 
 
 Official site on Facebook

1977 births
Living people
Actresses from Lima
Singers from Lima
Peruvian film actresses
Peruvian musical theatre actresses
Peruvian telenovela actresses
Peruvian television actresses
21st-century Peruvian women singers
21st-century Peruvian singers
20th-century Peruvian actresses
21st-century Peruvian actresses